Azambuja is a municipality in the Portuguese district of Lisbon, in the historical region of Ribatejo (and the sole municipality of within the district that does not belong to the historical province of Estremadura). The population in 2011 was 21,814, in an area of 262.66 km². Since 2002, it was integrated into the NUTS III statistical subregion of Lezíria do Tejo.

History

The town is so old that there is no longer any surviving record of when it received the privileged status embodied in a municipal charter.

In 1963 Ford opened an auto-assembly plant in Azambuja.

In 2000 the plant was integrated into the nearby auto-assembly business of General Motors (Opel). Opel Combo minivans were assembled until the end of 2006 when the plant was closed and production transferred to the manufacturer's plant near Saragossa (Spain).

Geography
The municipality is limited to the north by Rio Maior, to the northeast Santarém, to the east Cartaxo, to the southeast Salvaterra de Magos, to the south Benavente and Vila Franca de Xira and to the west by Alenquer and Cadaval.

Its seat is the town (vila) with the same name, which has 6,900 inhabitants and occupies the parish (freguesia) also named Azambuja. The total number of parishes is 7.

Demographics

Parishes
Administratively, the municipality is divided into 7 civil parishes (freguesias):
 Alcoentre
 Aveiras de Baixo
 Aveiras de Cima
 Azambuja
 Manique do Intendente, Vila Nova de São Pedro e Maçussa
 Vale do Paraíso
 Vila Nova da Rainha

Notable people 
 Giovanni Lopez de Andrade (1569 in Azambuja – 1628) a Roman Catholic prelate who served as Archbishop of Otranto 1623 to 1628

 Jose de Sousa (born 1974 in Azambuja) professional darts player.
 Gia Rodrigues (born in 2003) Supermodel and runner up to Miss Portugal contest in 2021

External links
Municipality official website
Azambujadigital - Web site related to Azambuja

Sources